Säkkipilli is the generic Finnish term for bagpipes, but is also applied to the formerly extinct traditional Finnish bagpipes which are currently being revived.

History
Images of a bagpipe appear in painting dating to the 15th century at a church in Taivassalo, though is not definite as to whether the image is intended to depict a local Finnish tradition. Later 17th century sources make mention of the bagpipes in Turku.

Revival
One prominent proponent of the revival of the Finnish pipes is the musician Petri Prauda.  Prauda began playing the Estonian torupill, and later had a Finnish bagpipes reconstructed based on museum examples.

References

External links
 Säkkipilli at Etno.net 

Reconstructed musical instruments
Finnish musical instruments
Bagpipes

fi:Säkkipilli